The 2021–22 season was the 82nd season in the history of Adana Demirspor and the first season back in the top tier of Turkish football, the Süper Lig. In addition to the domestic league, Adana Demirspor participated in this season's edition of the Turkish Cup.

Players

First-team squad

Out on loan

Competitions

Overall record

Süper Lig

League table

Results summary

Results by round

Matches

Turkish Cup

References 

Adana Demirspor